The 2019 Top League Cup was the second edition of the Top League Cup, a rugby union cup competition for Japan's Top League and Top Challenge League teams. This was the first time Top Challenge League teams played in the competition, after the 2018–19 featured Top League teams only.

Competition rules

The 24 Top League and Top Challenge League teams were divided into four pools for the first stage of the competition, seeded as per their final positions in the 2018–19 season. Each pool consisted of a top seed that finished in the top four of the 2018–19 Top League, a second seed that finished between 5th and 8th, a third seed that finished between 9th and 12th, a fourth seed that finished between 13th and 16th, a fifth seed that finished in the top four of the 2018 Top Challenge League and a sixth seed that either finished between 5th and 8th, or was newly-promoted to the Top Challenge League. Each team played the five other teams in their pool once.

The four group winners qualified to the finals tournament semifinals, with the two semifinal winners progressing to the final.

Teams
The following teams took part in the 2019 Top League Cup competition:

Pool phase

Pool A

Pool B

Pool C

Pool D

Cup playoffs

Semifinals

Final

References

2019
2019–20 in Japanese rugby union
2019–20 rugby union tournaments for clubs